...And Take It with a Grain of Salt is the first full-length album by the Indie rock band An Angle. It was originally released on UnderAcloud Records in 2002, and later re-released on Drive-Thru Records on November 9, 2004.

Track listing
"For Everyday Brought Up This One" – 3:36
"Unnoticeable" – 2:53   	
"Today I Saw Your Face" – 3:21  	
"Self Medicate" – 5:58	
"Like a Locket, Like a Necklace, Like a Bracelet" – 7:18  	
"Off to School" – 4:22
"Did You, Did You, Did You" – 4:27  	
"Flicker of a Cigarette" – 2:53  	
"There Is a Ship, Let's Sail" – 2:47  	
"Streetlights Usually Turn Yellow" – 2:33  	
"An Eagle Circles the Forest" – 13:15

References

An Angle albums
2004 debut albums
Drive-Thru Records albums